This is a list of Superfund sites in the Northern Mariana Islands designated under the Comprehensive Environmental Response, Compensation, and Liability Act (CERCLA) environmental law:

See also
List of Superfund sites in the United States
List of environmental issues
List of waste types
TOXMAP

References

External links
EPA list of current Superfund sites in the Northern Mariana Islands
EPA list of deleted Superfund sites in the Northern Mariana Islands

Northern Mariana Islands
Environment of the Northern Mariana Islands
Superfund